Fepuleai is a Samoan-language masculine given name and Samoan-language surname.
Notable people with the name include:

Given name 
 Fepuleai Ameperosa Roma (born ~1977), Samoan judge
 Fepuleai Semi, former Samoan politician
 Fepuleai Fa'asavalu Faimata Su'a (born ~1974), Samoan politician

Surname 
 Daniel Fepuleai (born 1988), Cook Islands professional rugby league footballer
 Toa Fepuleai, New Zealand former rugby league footballer
 Tofiga Fepulea'i, (born 1974) New Zealand actor and comedian
 Vincent Fepulea'i, Samoan former rugby union footballer

Samoan masculine given names
Samoan-language surnames
Surnames of Samoan origin